Ashton Music is a worldwide distributor of musical instruments and associated equipment, focussing particularly on high-quality entry-level lines. Its design headquarters is in Australia, but most of its manufacturing activity is in China.

See also

List of acoustic guitar brands
List of electric guitar brands

References

External links
 

Percussion instrument manufacturing companies
Companies established in 1997
Musical instrument manufacturing companies of Australia
Australian brands